Gasshō or gasshou can refer to

 gasshō (合掌), a position used for greeting in various Buddhist traditions
 gasshō-zukuri (合掌造), a style of Japanese farmhouses